Axios is a municipal unit of Delta, a municipality in the Thessaloniki regional unit, Greece. Before the 2011 local government reform, Axios was an independent municipality. The 2011 census recorded 6,613 inhabitants in the municipal unit. Axios covers an area of 86.532 km2.

See also
 List of settlements in the Thessaloniki regional unit

References

Populated places in Thessaloniki (regional unit)